Papyrus 73 (in the Gregory-Aland numbering), designated by 𝔓73, is a copy of the New Testament in Greek. It is a papyrus manuscript of the Gospel of Matthew. The surviving texts of Matthew are verses 25:43; 26:2-3. 
The manuscript paleographically has been assigned to the 7th century.

The Greek text of this codex is a representative of the Byzantine text-type, but the text is too brief for certainty. Aland placed it in Category V.

It is currently housed at the Bibliotheca Bodmeriana (L) in Cologny.

See also 

 List of New Testament papyri
 Bodmer Papyri

References

Further reading 

 Kurt Aland, Neue Neutestamentliche Papyri II, NTS 9 (1962-1963), pp. 303–316.

New Testament papyri
7th-century biblical manuscripts
Gospel of Matthew papyri